Sufri Bolkiah Secondary School (abbreviated as ) is a girls' government secondary school in Tutong, Brunei. The school provides secondary education from Year 7 to Year 11 that leads to O Level and IGCSE qualification.

Etymology 
Sufri Bolkiah Secondary School is named after Prince Sufri Bolkiah, a brother of the current Sultan of Brunei, Sultan Hassanal Bolkiah.

History 
Sufri Bolkiah Secondary School was established on 1 August 1969 as Tutong English School. Previously, the school was a branch of the English Preparatory School under Anthony Abell College in Seria from 1967. A separate administration was eventually established when there was a rise in student population as well as increasing difficulty in administering the Tutong branch due to the long distance between Tutong and Seria.

At first, Tutong English School was temporarily housed at Muda Hashim Malay School, the predecessor of Muda Hashim Primary School. In 1971, a new permanent campus was completed and in April of the following year the school was officiated by His Royal Highness Prince Sufri Bolkiah. In conjunction with the inauguration, Tutong English School was renamed Sufri Bolkiah English School. In 1985, the school was upgraded from preparatory to secondary and eventually adopted its current name.

The school becomes a single-sex school, only admitting female students, from 1998. At present, three are only four secondary schools nationwide that have female student population, the other three being Sekolah Tinggi Perempuan Raja Isteri (Raja Isteri Girls' High School), Pengiran Anak Puteri Hajah Masna Secondary School and Raja Isteri Pengiran Anak Hajah Saleha Girls' Secondary Arabic Religious School, as well as one of the seven single-sex secondary schools in the country, with the remaining three schools only admitting boys.

Academics 
The academic years consist of four or five years, beginning in Year 7. At the end of Year 11 (Year 10 for students in the 'express' stream), students sit for GCE O Level and/or IGCSE examination, which are provided by Cambridge International Examinations. For subjects pertaining to the Malay language and the religion of Islam, they are set by the Ministry of Education.

Students opting for sixth form after finishing secondary go to Tutong Sixth Form Centre. Alternatively, pursuing vocational education is possible at various vocational and technical schools as well as private post-secondary institution in other districts.

See also 
 List of secondary schools in Brunei

References 

Cambridge schools in Brunei
Secondary schools in Brunei